Operation Jeb Stuart III was a U.S. Army operation during the Vietnam War conducted by the 1st Cavalry Division that took place in Quảng Trị and Thừa Thiên Provinces of I Corps, South Vietnam from 17 May to 3 November 1968.

Background
Following the completion of Operation Pegasus from 1–14 April, Operation Delaware from 19 April to 17 May and Operation Concordia Square from 8–17 May, the 1st Cavalry Division returned to the coastal lowlands of Quảng Trị and Thừa Thiên Provinces to engage People's Army of Vietnam (PAVN) forces in their Base Areas 101 and 114 to the west of Quảng Trị and Huế. This was the original objective of Operation Jeb Stuart, but it had been disrupted by the Tet Offensive which instead saw the Division fight the Battle of Quang Tri and fight in the Battle of Huế.

Operation

May
On 21 May a unit of the 2nd Brigade received mortar fire and called in airstrikes on the firing positions. A search of the area found 12 PAVN dead. On 28 May a unit of the 1st Brigade received fire from a PAVN force in bunkers and attacked the position killing 11. Operational results to the end of May were 228 PAVN killed and 33 individual and six crew-served weapons captured. U.S. losses were 51 killed.

June
A Popular Force (PF) unit then swept the area killing a further 13. On 18 June at 06:10 Camp Evans was hit by five 122mm rockets causing minimal damage.

On 27 June at 09:05 the 3rd Battalion, 5th Cavalry Regiment, while patrolling near the hamlet of Binh An, 17 km east of Đông Hà, received heavy automatic weapons fire. Villagers fleeing from the hamlet reported that PAVN soldiers were hidden there in bunkers. A PAVN soldier, captured by the troopers, estimated that at least 200 soldiers were in the village. By 11:30 naval gunfire was placed on the target area by a Task Force in the South China Sea.  fired more than 300 rounds of 8-inch gunfire and more than 640 rounds of 5-inch gunfire into the area. The  fired over 1,390 rounds of 5-inch gunfire tire into the position. In addition, 26 tactical air strikes were flown by United States Marine Corps aircraft from Marine Aircraft Group 12 and the United States Air Force (USAF) 366th Tactical Fighter Wing onto the PAVN positions. Helicopter gunships from the 229th Assault Helicopter Battalion and the 2nd Battalion, 20th Artilley, fired more than 200 2.75-inch rockets at the position. Artillery support was provided by the 1st Battalion, 6th Marines. On the evening of the 27th, three companies from the 3/5th Cavalry were reinforced by a company from the 1/5th Cavalry, a company from the 2/5th Cavalry and a troop from the 2nd Squadron, 9th Cavalry Regiment completing a horseshoe cordon around the PAVN position. Contact was lost at 19:45 During the next two days, elements of the 3/5th Cavalry, reinforced by engineers, swept the area using APCs and bulldozers to destroy the bunkers and trench system. At the end of the sweep 225 PAVN dead bodies were counted. In addition 38 were captured and 64 individual and 14 crew-served weapons were captured. U.S. losses were three killed.

Cumulative operational results to the end of June were 756 PAVN killed and 330 individual and 45 crew-served weapons captured. U.S. losses were 104 killed.

July
On 17 July a company from the Division found the graves of 13 PAVN killed by artillery 2–3 weeks earlier. On 29 July a unit of the 3rd Brigade engaged an enemy force losing four killed.

Cumulative operational results to the end of July were 1,198 PAVN killed and 601 individual and 80 crew-served weapons captured. U.S. losses were 151 killed.

August
A Division unit operating with Regional Forces (RF) engaged a PAVN force 12 miles east of Quảng Trị killing 11 and capturing one and four individual weapons. On 9 August an OH-6 was shot down 19 miles north-northwest of Huế.

PAVN losses were 17 killed and two captured, U.S. losses were 18 killed. The 2nd Brigade killed 66 PAVN and captured nine; U.S. losses were three killed. A unit of the 1st Brigade found 85 PAVN dead in bunkers 4 miles northeast of Quảng Trị. On 29 August a unit of the 3rd Brigade found 12 PAVN dead 12 miles west of Huế.

Cumulative operational results to the end of August were 1,742 PAVN killed and 819 individual and 118 crew-served weapons captured. U.S. losses were 197 killed.

September
Cumulative operational results to the end of September were 1,888 PAVN killed and 922 individual and 119 crew-served weapons captured. U.S. losses were 208 killed.

October

Aftermath
On 28 October the Division began Operation Liberty Canyon moving south from I Corps to III Corps to join Operation Toan Thang II. The operation terminated on 3 November. Cumulative operational results were 2,014 PAVN killed and 251 captured and 1,078 individual and 124 crew-served weapons captured. U.S. losses were 222 killed.

References

External links
 NARA footage of the operation

Battles and operations of the Vietnam War
Battles and operations of the Vietnam War in 1968
Military operations of the Vietnam War
History of Quảng Trị province
History of Thừa Thiên Huế province